Molson is a former brewing company and the brand name of its beer.

Molson may also refer to:

Related to the brewing company
Molson family, a Canadian family that has been influential in business and politics
 Molson Coors Beverage Company, the company that currently owns the Molson brand
 Molson Bank, a former Canadian bank
Molson Bank Building, its headquarters in Montreal
 Molson Stadium, a stadium in Montreal
 Molson Cup, an ice hockey trophy
 Molson Amphitheatre, a concert hall in Toronto
 Molson Prize, an arts prize
 Barrie Molson Centre, an arena
 Molson, Washington, a mining town named for John W. Molson
 Molson Canadian Rocks for Toronto, a benefit concert
 John Molson School of Business at Concordia University
 Molson Centre, former name of Montreal's main arena (renamed Bell Centre)

Other uses
 Hugh Molson, Baron Molson, British MP and Peer
 Mark Molson, American bridge player
 Molson Lake (Manitoba)
 Molson Lake Airport

See also
 Molson Indy (disambiguation), a series of automobile races